American French is a collective term used for the varieties of the French language that are spoken in North America, which include:
Canadian French
Quebec French
Joual
Ontario French
Métis French
Acadian French
Chiac
St. Marys Bay French
Brayon
Newfoundland French
in the United States:
Frenchville French
Louisiana French
Missouri French
Muskrat French
New England French (a variety of Canadian French spoken in New England)
Haitian French
Saint-Barthélemy French

See also  
Americans in France
Francophonie
French-based creole languages
French Guianese Creole
Haitian Creole
Karipúna French Creole
Louisiana Creole
Michif
French America
French Americans
French language in Canada
French language in the United States
French language in Minnesota
Varieties of French

French dialects
French language in the Americas